Águeda was a freguesia ("civil parish") in Águeda Municipality, Aveiro District, Portugal. It had an area of 41.6 km2 and in 2011 had a population of 11,346.

History
In 2013 it was merged with Borralha to form the new freguesia of Águeda e Borralha.

Places 
 Alagoa
 Alhandra 
 Ameal 
 Assequins
 Bolfiar 
 Catraia de Assequins 
 Cavadas 
 Giesteira 
 Gravanço 
 Lapas de S. Pedro
 Maçoida 
 Ninho de Águia 
 Paredes 
 Raivo 
 Regote 
 Rio Covo 
 Sardão 
 S. Pedro 
 Vale de Erva 
 Vale Domingos 
 Vale Durão 
 Vale Durão 
 Vale do Sobreirinho 
 Vale Verde

Demography

Politics

Elections 
In the 2009 local elections for the Assembly of the Freguesia, there were 10,328 registered voters, with 5,698 (55.17%) voting and 4,630 (44.83%) abstaining. The Socialist Party got 3,039 votes (53.33%), electing eight members of the Assembly, the Social Democratic Party got 1,495 votes (26.24%), electing four members of the Assembly and the Democratic and Social Centre – People's Party got 482 votes (8.46%), electing one member of the Assembly. The three remaining lists did not elect any member of the Assembly. As of 31 December 2011, the freguesia had 10,396 registered voters.

Religion 
The Portuguese Roman Catholic Church's Diocese of Aveiro includes the Parish of Águeda as part of the archpriestship of Águeda.

Built Heritage
The Pillory of Assequins, now fragmented, is located in this former freguesia and is classified as an Imóvel de Interesse Público.

References 

Former parishes of Águeda
2013 disestablishments in Portugal
Populated places disestablished in 2013